Speakers and Tweeters (2007) is the third studio album released by London-based band Dub Pistols. Many of the tracks feature vocals by The Specials' singer Terry Hall.

Track listing
All songs co-written by band members Barry Ashworth, T. K. Lawrence, and Jason O'Bryan unless otherwise indicated:
 "Speed of Light" (feat. Blade) - 4:08
 "Peaches" (feat. Rodney P & Terry Hall) - 3:13 (J.J. Burnel, Hugh Cornwell, Brian Duffy, Dave Greenfield)
 "Speakers and Tweeters" - 3:50
 "Running from the Thoughts" (feat. Terry Hall) - 4:12
 "Rapture" (feat. Terry Hall) - 3:54 (Debbie Harry, Chris Stein)
 "Cruise Control" - 3:29
 "Open" - 4:10
 "You'll Never Find" (feat. Rodney P) - 4:23 (Kenneth Gamble, Leon Huff)
 "Gangsters" (feat. Terry Hall) - 3:01 (Bradbury, Byers, Campbell, Dammers, Golding, Hall, Panter, Staple)
 "Something to Trust" (feat. Rodney P) - 3:33 (Ashworth, O'Bryan, Rodney P)
 "Mach 10" - 3:47 (Ashworth, James Dewees, Lawrence, O'Bryan)
 "Stronger" - 3:54 (Ashworth, Ronnie Black, Lawrence, O'Bryan)
 "Gave You Time" - 3:45
 "You'll Never Find" (Dub) - 4:16 [bonus track]
 "Stronger" (Dub) - 3:28 [bonus track]

References

External links
 Dub Pistols official website

Dub Pistols albums
Sunday Best (music company) albums
2007 albums